Dreamville Ventures is an American multi-disciplinary media company co-founded by J. Cole and Ibrahim "Ib" Hamad in 2020. It is a parent company to Dreamville Studios, which was also launched in 2020.

History
On October 12, 2020, Dreamville announced the formation of Dreamville Ventures with Damien Scott leading the division as president with Candace Rodney as executive vice president, overseeing daily operations including verticals across music, TV and film, publishing, apparel and live events. On April 19, 2021, Dreamville Ventures partnered with the Marcus Graham Project and their iCR8 Bootcamp, a program dedicated to media marketing. The partnership with Apple aims to increase diversity and equity in the music and entertainment industry.

Divisions

Dreamville Studios
On October 12, 2020, Dreamville Studios was launched, a content studio that will produce original and co-produced content, with Candace Rodney who serves as president of Dreamville Studios. Candace Rodney previously worked as Senior Vice President of Development at Wilmore Films, as well as positions at Sony Pictures Television, Lionsgate Television and Creative Artists Agency.

Dreamville Films
Dreamville Films, Inc is an American entertainment company founded in 2015 that produces and distributes films. In 2015, they established a distribution deal HBO. They released documentaries J. Cole: Road to Homecoming, Forest Hills Drive: Homecoming, and J. Cole: 4 Your Eyez Only in partnership with HBO.

Dreamville Festival
On April 27, 2018, J. Cole announced the Dreamville Festival, the festival featuring local music, culture, food and art, and also include a mix of up-and-comers and national acts. It is expected to be an annual festival. However, in the wake of Hurricane Florence, the event was postponed from its original date. The festival was rescheduled and be held at Dorothea Dix Park in Raleigh, North Carolina on April 6, 2019. The Dreamville Festival donated proceeds to the Dorothea Dix Park Conservancy and the Dreamville Foundation.

For the 2020 season, the Dreamville Festival is front-of-jersey sponsor for USL Championship soccer team North Carolina FC. The second annual festival was initially slated for April 4, 2020 however, due to the COVID-19 pandemic it was postponed and eventually cancelled. 

On September 27, 2021, Dreamville announced the second annual festival will be taking place on April 2 and April 3, 2022. Following the cancelation due to the global pandemic, Adam Roy said in a press release, "It's exciting to finally be back. Ever since we wrapped our first fest, we've been waiting to get back to the park with our Dreamville family. We had to come back bigger and better than before." The two-day festival will also be at Dorothea Dix Park in Raleigh, North Carolina.

Filmography

Films and series

Podcasts

References

Film production companies of the United States
Mass media companies established in 2020
J. Cole